Kalai Mathee is a professor at Florida International University, joint editor-in-chief of the Journal of Medical Microbiology, and an elected fellow of the American Academy of Microbiology. She is known for her research on bacterial infections caused by Pseudomonas aeruginosa.

Early life and education 
Kalai Mathee was born into a working-class family in Malaysia to Kuyilar Kaliaperumal and Loganayaki. She is of Tamil heritage and got her early education in a vernacular school SJKT Kerajaan in Ipoh. She has a Bachelor of Science in Genetics from the University of Malaya in Kuala Lumpur, graduating in 1984, and completed her master's in molecular genetics focusing on Neisseria gonorrhoeae in 1986 under the tutelage of Chong-Lek Koh. Mathee did her Ph.D. (1992) at the University of Tennessee Health Science Center at Memphis under Martha Howe's guidance specializing in transcription. Mathee did two post-doctorate fellowships, one at Tufts University focusing on Helicobacter pylori pathogenesis in the year 1993; the other at University of Tennessee Health Science Center working on Pseudomonas aeruginosa pathogenesis from 1993-1999. In 2018, she received her master's degree in Public Health in Health Policy and Management from Florida International University.

Career 
In 1999, Mathee moved to Florida International University where she was promoted to professor in 2013. She did a sabbatical at Harvard Medical School in Stephen Lory’s lab from 2006-2007. In 2007 she was the founding chair of the Department of Molecular Microbiology and Infectious Diseases at Florida International University.

In 2017, Mathee and Norman Fry were named co-editors-in-cChief of the Journal of Medical Microbiology.

Research 
Since 1993, the major focus of Mathee’s research has been the pathobiology of Pseudomonas aeruginosa chronic infections with specific emphasis on β-lactam resistance, alginate overproduction, comparative genomics, alternative therapies, and cystic fibrosis lung ecology. Her early research identified the function and regulatory mechanisms of the bacteriophage Mu. Her postdoctoral research focused on alginate gene regulation with a focus on the alginate-specific sigma factor, AlgT/U, and she was the first to show MucA is an inner membrane protein. Mathee also showed that polymorphonuclear leukocytes and oxygen radicals can contribute to mucoid conversion by Pseudomonas aeruginosa. Mathee has examined the role of quorum sensing molecules in Pseudomonas aeruginosa infections, and demonstrated that alginate is not required for biofilm formation. Her work has used comparative genomics and transcriptomics to define variability across strains of Pseudomonas aeruginosa. A portion of Mathee's research is on β-lactam resistance, particularly the amp pathway where she showed the presence of a β-lactamase PoxB, two permeases, and coregulation of antibiotic resistance and other virulence factors mediated by AmpR. Current ongoing research focuses on exploring various microbiomes, including lung, irritable bowel syndrome, vaginal, and gut.

Selected publications

Awards and honors 
In 2011, she was awarded the President’s Council Worlds Ahead Faculty Award from Florida International University. Mathee was named a distinguished fellow of the Malaysian Biotechnology Information Centre in 2013. In 2014, she was one of the inaugural recipients of the New England Biolabs Passion in Science Award. In 2020, Mathee was elected a fellow of the American Academy of Microbiology. Mathee is the first Florida International University faculty member to receive this honor, and the first Malaysian woman to receive this honor. In 2022 she was awarded the Microbiology Society's Microbiology Outreach Prize.

Personal life 
In 1993, she married a computer science professor, Giri Narasimhan, in Nashville, Tennessee.

References

External links 
 

University of Malaya alumni
University of Tennessee alumni
Florida International University alumni
Florida International University faculty
Fellows of the American Academy of Microbiology
Women microbiologists
Living people
1959 births